Kamel Zaiem (born 25 May 1983) is a Tunisian football manager and former player who played as a midfielder.

Career
Zaiem started his career by playing with his home town club AS Ariana where he became professional in 2001. After two seasons playing with Ariana in the Tunisian second league, in 2003 he signed with one of the most popular Tunisian clubs, the Espérance Sportive de Tunis. Brough as a prospective young player Zaiem will play with Espérance 5 seasons and becoming an important club player. Until 2008, he won with Espérance 2 national championships and 3 cups.

By 2008 he had become a national team player, and after 5 seasons and a number of titles won with Espérance he decided to move abroad, signing with Serbian club FK Partizan. However tough competition in the midfield made Zaiem lack much chances to play, and he ended up leaving in the winter break after playing only 6 matches in the Serbian SuperLiga in 6 months, but not without collecting the "double" won by the club that season.

In early 2009 he decided to move to Arab football, joining Al-Khor Sports Club playing in the Qatar Stars League, but in next summer Zaiem will return to Tunisia and wear the shirt number 10 with Club Sportif Sfaxien. During his 2-year spell with Sfaxien, he played the 2010 CAF Confederation Cup final where they lost against FUS Rabat, a 3-2 in aggregate. After the first match having finished with a 0-0 tie, in the second match while the match was tie 1-1 in the start of the second half Zaiem gave the lead to Sfaxien by scoring a penalty in the 49 minute however the Moroccan club scored two more goals in the second half making the final score of 2-3.

In summer 2011 Zaiem signed with Egyptian top league club ENPPI.

In the summer 2012 Zaiem signed with Tunisian league club CA Bizertin on a two-year contract. He retired in winter 2015.

National team
Kamel Zaiem played his first match for the Tunisian national team in 2006. Within the two last seasons with Espérance he had started receiving regularly calls, and he was selected for the Tunisian team at the 2008 Africa Cup of Nations. By 2013 he has played 14 matches for Tunisia, having scored twice.

Managerial career
On 22 September 2020, Zaiem was appointed as head coach of Saudi Arabian club Al-Kawkab. On 8 December 2020, Zaiem was sacked after 9 rounds.

Honours
Espérance
Tunisian Ligue Professionnelle 1: 2003-04, 2005-06
Tunisian Cup: 2006, 2007, 2008

Partizan
Serbian SuperLiga: 2008–09
Serbian Cup: 2008–09

Sfaxien
CAF Confederation Cup: Runner-up 2010

Bizertin
Tunisian Cup: 2013

References

External links
 

1983 births
Living people
Tunisian footballers
Tunisia international footballers
2008 Africa Cup of Nations players
Association football midfielders
AS Ariana players
Espérance Sportive de Tunis players
CS Sfaxien players
FK Partizan players
Serbian SuperLiga players
Expatriate footballers in Serbia
Al-Khor SC players
Qatar Stars League players
Expatriate footballers in Qatar
ENPPI SC players
Egyptian Premier League players
Expatriate footballers in Egypt
CA Bizertin players
Tunisian football managers
US Ben Guerdane managers